WJZI (1540 AM) was a daytime-only radio station which broadcast a Jazz format. Licensed to Decatur, Indiana, United States, the station was last owned by Lewis Broadcasting, LLC.

In December 2011, WADM dropped its classic country format in favor of Jazz as WJZI ("Jazz in Indiana"). The new station played traditional jazz, as opposed to "smooth jazz". WJZI was the only full-time commercial jazz radio station in Indiana.

Lewis Broadcasting surrendered WJZI's license to the Federal Communications Commission on May 14, 2021, and it was cancelled on May 17.

See also
 List of jazz radio stations in the United States

References

External links
FCC Station Search Details: DWJZI (Facility ID: 71465)
FCC History Cards for WJZI (covering 1960-1979 as WADM )

JZI
Radio stations established in 1962
JZI
Radio stations disestablished in 2021
Defunct radio stations in the United States
JZI
1962 establishments in Indiana
2021 disestablishments in Indiana